The men's 4 × 400 metres relay competition at the 2002 Asian Games in Busan, South Korea was held on 12 and 13 October at the Busan Asiad Main Stadium.

Schedule
All times are Korea Standard Time (UTC+09:00)

Records 

 United States's world record was rescinded in 2008.

Results 
Legend
DNS — Did not start
DSQ — Disqualified

1st round 
 Qualification: First 3 in each heat (Q) and the next 2 fastest (q) advance to the final.

Heat 1

Heat 2

Final

References

External links 
Results

Athletics at the 2002 Asian Games
2002